Oregon Route 104 (OR 104) is a state highway in Clatsop County, Oregon, United States. OR 104 is known as the Fort Stevens Highway No. 104 (see Oregon highways and routes).

The OR 104 designation was applied to the Fort Stevens Highway in 2002 as part of Oregon's project to assign route numbers to highways that did not have route numbers.

Route description

The southern terminus of OR 104 is at a junction with US 101 near south of Warrenton. The southern portion of the route constitutes an old portion of US 101. The spur, known as the Fort Stevens Spur No. 485, also constitutes an old portion of US 101.

History
The Fort Stevens Highway No. 104 was established as a secondary highway on December 30, 1946. On February 19, 1981, OR 104 was extended southward to an old alignment of US 101, while US 101 was moved to a new alignment. On September 19, 2002, OR 104 was assigned to the Fort Stevens Highway.

Major intersections

Spur route

Oregon Route 104S (OR 104S), also known as Fort Stevens Spur No. 485, is a  spur route of OR 104 in Warrenton, that connects OR 104 with US 101.

See also

 List of numbered state routes in Oregon

References

External links

104
Transportation in Clatsop County, Oregon